The Mercedes-Benz M 196 engine is a naturally-aspirated, straight-8, racing engine, designed, developed, and produced by Daimler-Benz; and used in both sports car racing and Formula One racing, between 1954 and 1955. Daimler-Benz made two versions of the engine, the M 196 R, displacing 2.5 litres, and the M 196 S, displacing 3.0 litres.

Mercedes pulled out of all motorsports after the 1955 Le Mans disaster. This was their last Formula One engine, and Mercedes did not return to motorsport as an engine manufacturer until , when they supplied engines to the Sauber Formula One team.

M 196 R

The new 1954 Formula One rules allowed a choice of naturally aspirated engines – up to 2.5 litres or 0.75 litres supercharged.

By its introduction at the 1954 French GP the  (76.0×68.8 mm)  desmodromic valves straight 8 M 196 R delivered . The M 196 was the only F1 engine with direct fuel injection, giving it a considerable advantage over the other carburetted engines.

M 196 S

For the W 196 S race car, the M 196 engine was bored and stroked to 78 mm each (78.0 × 78.0 mm), and reduced in compression from ε=12 to about ε=9.

The M 196 S is canted to the right at a 53° angle. It has two four-cylinder banks made of silumin with chromium-coated aluminium cylinder sleeves. Unlike typical car engines, the M 196 S has a crankshaft consisting of two Hirth joint halves with centre torque take-off. The silumin cylinder heads are crossflow heads and cast together with the cylinder banks (i. e. block and head are a single cast piece). Daimler-Benz fitted the engine with a dry-sump lubrication system, water cooling, and a direct fuel injection system. The ignition system is a traditional magneto system.

Applications
Mercedes-Benz W196
Mercedes-Benz 300 SLR

References

Mercedes-Benz engines
Straight-eight engines
Formula One engines
Engines by model
Gasoline engines by model